Pekka Tirkkonen (born July 17, 1968) is a Finnish ice hockey coach and former professional ice hockey player. He most recently served as head coach of EHC Kloten of the National League (NL). Tirkkonen was selected by the Boston Bruins in the 2nd round (34th overall) of the 1986 NHL Entry Draft.

Playing career 
Tirkkonen played 14 seasons in Finnland's top-tier SM-liiga, registering 161 goals, 236 assists, 397 points, and 241 penalty minutes, in 647 games played for HC TPS, KalPa and SaiPa. He won the championship with TPS in 1989, 1990 and 1991.

Other stops in his playing career included Germany (Starbulls Rosenheim, Augsburger Panther), Sweden (Linköping HC) and Denmark (Herning Blue Fox). He claimed the Danish championship with Herning in 2005, 2007 and 2008, before retiring following the 2007–08 season.

Coaching career 
Tirkkonen kicked off his career behind the bench immediately after retiring as a player and was appointed as head coach of Finnish second division side SaPKo prior to the 2008–09 season. After four year at the helm and after receiving Mestis Coach of the Year honors in 2012, he moved on and was named head coach of SaiPa of the country's top-tier Liiga ahead of the 2012-13 campaign. In the 2013–14 season, Tirkkonen won the Kalevi Numminen Trophy as the league's Coach of the Year. He guided SaiPa to the Liiga semifinals that season, where they fell short to eventual champions Kärpät.

Tirkkonen parted ways with SaiPa following the 2015–16 season and was named head coach of EHC Kloten of the National League (NL) on June 24, 2016. He was fired on October 16, 2017, following poor coaching performances.

Career statistics

Regular season and playoffs

International

References

External links

1968 births
Living people
People from Savonlinna
Finnish ice hockey right wingers
Boston Bruins draft picks
SaiPa players
Sportspeople from South Savo